Walter Brown Arena is a 3,806-seat multi-purpose arena in Boston, Massachusetts. It is home to the Boston University Terriers women's ice hockey team and hosted the men's team before they moved to Agganis Arena. It is named in honor of Walter A. Brown, the original owner of the Boston Celtics, former president of the Boston Bruins and second manager of the Boston Garden (after his father). The arena is part of the Harold Case Physical Education Center, which includes Case Gym directly above the arena, as well as the former home of student recreation before the opening of the John Hancock Student Village. The building lies in the general area of the left field pavilion seats at the former Braves Field, whose right field pavilion and a portion of the field have been converted to neighboring Nickerson Field.

It hosted the first rounds of the 2003 and 2004 America East Conference men's basketball tournaments. It is the practice rink for the three-time National Champion Boston University figure skating team (2009, 2010, and 2017).  It is also the home rink for Boston University's Men's and Women's Club Ice Hockey teams.

While it is known as the home of four BU men's hockey NCAA championships, one of its most famous (and tragic) events occurred in October 1995, when Travis Roy, a 20-year-old freshman hockey player, lost his balance attempting to make a check eleven seconds into his first collegiate hockey shift versus North Dakota, breaking his neck at the fourth vertebra and paralyzing him from the neck down. In 1999, his jersey number 24 became the first retired number in program history.

The BU men's hockey team returned to Walter Brown for the first time in nearly ten years on Dec. 19, 2014 for an exhibition game against the United States men's national junior ice hockey team.

On December 30th, 2022, the BU Men's Hockey team returned to Walter Brown for the first regular season game held with fans since January 2nd, 2005. Senior Captain Dom Fensore netted the OT winner to defeat Harvard, 2-1.

References

1971 establishments in Massachusetts
Indoor arenas in Massachusetts
College ice hockey venues in the United States
Indoor ice hockey venues in Massachusetts
Boston University Terriers sports venues
Basketball venues in Massachusetts
Sports venues completed in 1971